The Lac aux Dorés (English: Dorés Lake) is a freshwater body in the city of Chibougamau, in Jamésie, in the administrative region of Nord-du-Québec, in the province of Quebec, at Canada. The surface of the lake extends into the townships of Roy, McKenzie, and Obalski.

Recreational tourism activities are the main economic activities of the sector; the mining industry, second.

The hydrographic slope of "Lac aux Dorés" is accessible on the west side by the forest road route 167 (linking Chibougamau to Saint-Félicien, Quebec), coming from the South, and connecting with route 113 (connecting Lebel-sur-Quévillon via Chapais. In this area, the railway of Canadian National goes along route 167.

The surface of "Lac aux Dorés" is usually frozen from early November to mid-May, however, safe ice circulation is generally from mid-November to mid-April.

Geography

Toponymy
During the passage in this sector in 1870, a mining prospecting team, James Richardson then makes a summary description of this lake, without designating it toponymically.

At the beginning of the 20th century, gangs of the Cree community began to settle in the area. In 1901, surveyor Henry O'Sullivan wrote that this picturesque, gently sloping watercourse is surrounded by high mountains to the north and east. A few years later, several deposits of ore, copper, silver and gold were identified. As early as 1914, a publication reporting "Lac Doré" pointed out that its denomination is associated with the main species of fish that was fished there.

Especially since the 1930s and 1940s, the town of Chibougamau has developed a few kilometers to the northwest. Several mining sites have been exploited around the lake. Toponymic variant: Lac Obalski.

The toponym "Lac aux Dorés" was formalized on December 5, 1968, by the Commission de toponymie du Québec when it was created.

Notes and references

See also 

Eeyou Istchee James Bay
Lakes of Nord-du-Québec
Nottaway River drainage basin